Tanoura may refer to:

 Tanoura (dance), an Egyptian folk dance
 Tanoura (costume), a weighted skirt typically used in the dance
 Tanoura, Kumamoto, a former town in Japan